Trio-Twister was a German aircraft manufacturer based in Eichwalde and founded by Siegfried Stolle. The company specialized in the design and manufacture of powered parachutes in the form of ready-to-fly aircraft for the US FAR 103 Ultralight Vehicles and the European Fédération Aéronautique Internationale microlight categories.

The company seems to have been founded about 2003 and gone out of business in 2005.

Trio-Twister produced two powered parachute designs, the single-seat Trio-Twister 103 and two-seat Trio-Twister 203. Both incorporated a central canopy attachment and tilting seats to allow the pilot to see up and backwards to ensure that canopy inflates correctly.

Aircraft

References

External links
Company website archives on Archive.org

Defunct aircraft manufacturers of Germany
Ultralight aircraft
Powered parachutes